The National Arena League (NAL) is a professional indoor football league that began play in 2017. It consists of teams based on the East Coast of the United States.

Teams' typical payroll budget is $600,000 per season, but as of 2022 season, there's no salary cap limit. Players are usually paid $200 per week (before taxes), and veterans can make $225 with the potential raises for loyalty on a year-by-year basis. Additionally, $50 bonus is given to players on the winning team each week. Some teams also provide housing for its players during the season.

History

Origins
In June 2016, Columbus Lions' owner Skip Seda and father Keke Seda founded a league called the Arena Developmental League (ADL) in the wake of several years of minor indoor leagues folding. The league was announced to begin play in March 2017 and, while not affiliated with any other leagues, intended on developing players to be looked at by scouts in the Arena Football League (AFL), Canadian Football League (CFL), and National Football League (NFL). In their introductory press conference, the league announced former AFL, af2, and CFL head coach John Gregory as its first commissioner and former AFL and af2 head coach Chris Siegfried as director of football operations.

Charter teams began being announced in July 2016 with the Columbus Lions and Lehigh Valley Steelhawks joining from the defunct American Indoor Football.  On July 21, the High Country Grizzlies announced their ADL membership after initially being announced as an AIF expansion team.  On August 11, the Dayton Wolfpack were announced as the league's fourth team. On September 13, the ADL added the Georgia Firebirds from the AIF as the fifth team. On September 21, the league announced its sixth team to be from Highland Heights, Kentucky, owned by Northern Kentucky Professional Indoor Football LLC headed by W. Leland Bennett III. Bennett was one of the owners of the Northern Kentucky Nightmare, a travel team that played in the AIF the previous season, but no name for the ADL team was announced and the franchise was removed from the league when the league later changed names. In October, the ADL added the Anderson Gladiators from Anderson, South Carolina, but they were removed from the league in November due to arena lease issues. On October 17, the Corpus Christi Rage announced it had joined the ADL (although the ADL did not confirm until October 28).  On October 20, the ADL announced that the Fort Myers area-based Florida Tarpons were joining the league. However, the Tarpons would also withdraw from the league on November 10 to join the upstart Arena Pro Football.

National Arena League: first seasons

2017 season

On November 18, 2016, the league announced it had changed its name to National Arena League. As part of the change in name, the league management was also restructured so that it was no longer managed by Lions' owner Skip Seda, but was instead managed by all member teams equally. Later that day, the league added a former Arena Football League team, the Jacksonville Sharks. On November 30, the league added the Monterrey Steel from Monterrey, Nuevo León, Mexico, becoming the first American indoor/arena league to house a Mexican team as well as the first in fifteen years to house a team from outside the United States. In order to satisfy the Sharks' contract with their arena, they were given eight home games in the 12-game season. To balance the uneven scheduling, the Corpus Christi Rage and Dayton Wolfpack each only were given five home games while the other five teams each had six. This was changed again when the Wolfpack apparently never were able to secure an arena lease, despite announcing they would play at the Nutter Center and signed players were reporting on social media that all players had been cut. As of February 20, 2017, all Wolfpack home games were cancelled. During the season, the league took over operations of the Firebirds, Rage, and Wolfpack. The Sharks would go on to finish with an 11–1 record and win the inaugural championship game over the Lions. The Rage and Wolfpack folded at the end of the season.

During the first season, the league announced the first 2018 expansion team in the Jersey Flight of Trenton, New Jersey. During the summer league meetings, the NAL conditionally approved ownership groups in Boston, Providence, Richmond, and Orlando with an expansion application deadline of August 15, 2017. The Richmond Roughriders, formerly of Arena Pro Football, confirmed the next day that they were finalizing their NAL expansion requirements. However, on September 13, the Roughriders announced they were joining the American Arena League instead.

2018 season
On September 28, 2017, the NAL announced on their Facebook page that the Jacksonville Sharks, Lehigh Valley Steelhawks, Columbus Lions, and Jersey Flight had all signed three-year NAL membership agreements and committed to play in the league until 2020. The Monterrey Steel could not commit for 2018 citing the 2017 Central Mexico earthquake. The Georgia Firebirds could not commit due to an ownership transition, but failed to obtain an arena lease. Despite the initially announced August 15 deadline, the next confirmed expansion team was announced in November as the Massachusetts Pirates based out of Worcester, Massachusetts. In the expansion announcement, the league also mentioned adding teams in Greensboro, North Carolina, and Portland, Maine, but no mention of the other previously conditionally approved teams in Boston, Providence, or Orlando. The Carolina Cobras were announced in Greensboro on December 4 and the Maine Mammoths on December 5, with both teams owned by National Sports Ventures, and organization led by NAL executive Rob Storm and Atlanta businessman Richard Maslia and includes Sharks' owner and expansion chairman Jeff Bouchy. The Monterrey Steel and the expansion Jersey Flight would be removed from the league for failing to meet the minimum league obligations prior to the release of the 2018 schedule.

In October 2017, commissioner Gregory stepped down and was replaced by the director of operations, Chris Siegfried. The 2018 season began on April 7, 2018. All three expansion teams fared well, with the Cobras winning the league championship, the Pirates finishing the regular season in first place, and the Mammoths ending the season on a five-game winning streak. However, the Lehigh Valley Steelhawks finished the season winless and the owner announced he was trying to sell the team, while the Mammoths were also announced as looking for local ownership.

2019 season
The league announced its first addition of the 2019 season in the New York Streets with plans to play at the Westchester County Center in White Plains, New York, in December 2018. A revived Orlando Predators team, owned and coached by players from the former Arena Football League team of the same name, was added on January 17, 2019. After failing to reach an agreement with local ownership, both the Lehigh Valley Steelhawks and Maine Mammoths announced they had suspended operations for the season. Prior to the 2019 season, Sharks' majority owner and NAL expansion chairman Jeff Bouchy resigned and sold his interest in the team to the other owners on March 11, 2019. The Sharks won the 2019 NAL championship.

2020 season–present
Following the season, the NAL announced it had partnered with Champions Indoor Football (CIF) to create a new league for the 2020 season under a new identity with two conferences: the CIF and NAL. The Massachusetts Pirates chose to not join the merged league and the New York Streets were not mentioned as an included team. However, it was announced on October 10 that the deal had been postponed, with both leagues playing their own individual schedules in 2020. The Pirates rejoined the NAL and the league then added two teams that had originally been given conditional approval to join in the 2018 season, the Jersey Flight and the West Virginia Roughriders (then known as the Richmond Roughriders), from the American Arena League. As with almost all other sports leagues, the NAL suspended operations during the COVID-19 pandemic, with intention to hold the season once social distancing mandates were lifted and it was safe to do so. The season was fully cancelled by June 12, 2020.

2021 season
Following the cancellation of the 2020 season, Massachusetts Pirates left for the Indoor Football League (IFL), while the NAL announced the additions of the Albany Empire, Baltimore Lightning, Louisville Xtreme, Ontario Bandits, and the Tampa Bay Tornadoes. The Baltimore franchise membership was revoked less than three weeks after being announced. The Louisville and Tampa Bay organizations left the league three months after being added, and the West Virginia Roughriders opted to go dormant for 2021 while the owner was trying to sell the team. Louisville instead joined the IFL. The start of the 2021 season was delayed to at least May 2021 due to the ongoing restrictions in the pandemic. One week before the start of the 2021 season, the Ontario Bandits went dormant.

2022 season

For the 2022 season, the league announced it was going to start playing using ironman rules, where most players must play both offense and defense, as originally used by the Arena Football League from 1987 to 2007. In October 2021, the Roughriders stated they will not return to the NAL during a dispute with the league contract, but were then in discussions with selling the team to the ownership group led by Ron Trideco to keep the team in the NAL. On November 11, the league announced the San Antonio Gunslingers as an expansion team after playing their inaugural 2021 season in the AAL. The Roughriders, Ontario Bandits, and Jersey Flight were eventually removed from the list of 2022 NAL teams and were not included in the schedule.

2023 season 

On July 14, the league announced its first addition for the 2023 season in Fayetteville, North Carolina.  At halftime of the 2022 NAL Championship, the league announced that the West Texas Warbirds from Odessa, Texas would be joining the league for 2023.  On August 24, 2022, the league announced the return of rebound nets, which was popularized by the Arena Football League. On December 22, it was announced that the league had discontinued the membership of the Columbus Lions.

Teams

Map of teams

Current members

Former members

Championships

References

External links
 National Arena League's official website

 
Sports leagues established in 2017
2017 establishments in the United States
Professional sports leagues in the United States